Lord Byron is a film by Zack Godshall and Ross Brupbacher. It premiered at the 2011 Sundance Film Festival and is garnering praise from the industry as a technical achievement and from critics as an important work of Southern United States fiction.

References

External links

2011 films
Culture of the Southern United States
Films set in the Southern United States
2011 comedy-drama films